Deh-e Parkak (also known as Deh-e Parak) is a village in Hudian Rural District, in the Central District of Dalgan County, Sistan and Baluchestan Province, Iran. At the 2006 census, its population was 100, in 15 families.

References 

Populated places in Dalgan County